Thomas Proe (1852–1922) was an alderman and mayor of Brisbane, Queensland, Australia.

Personal life
Thomas Proe was born in 1852 at Wigan, Lancashire, England, the son of Thomas Proe and Jane Beckman.

He came to Queensland in 1876 and married Mary Strasburg (daughter of Frederick Strasburg and Frederica Mundt) in Brisbane in 1881. They had seven children:
 Frederick Thomas (born 1882, died 1886)
 Ethel Mary (born 1884, died 1888)
 Martha Jane Jubilee (born 1887, married John McClew MacGibbon in 1928)
 Bertha (born 1889, married Hector Marwick in 1915)
 Eveline Mary (born 1893)
 Victor Thomas (born 1897, married Mabel Annie Sinnamon in 1921)
 Cara May Gladys (born 1901, married Lancelot Walter Trout in 1925)

Proe died on 17 December 1922 at his residence "Wyralla", Mark street, New Farm, aged 71 years. He is buried in Toowong Cemetery. His wife died in 1924 and is buried with him.

Business life
Thomas Proe trained as an engineer in England, but in Brisbane he became a publican. He owned the Osborne Hotel and later Royal George Hotel, Ann Street, Fortitude Valley.

Public life
Thomas Proe was served as an alderman of the Brisbane Municipal Council from 1895 to 1905. He was mayor of the Brisbane Municipal Council in 1901 and again in 1905 as mayor of the Brisbane City Council (Brisbane having become a city in 1903). His service to the council, included
 Finance Committee 1895, 1899, 1902, 1904
 Legislative Committee 1895, 1899, 1902, 1903
 Works Committee 1896, 1900–1903, 1905
 Parks Committee 1896, 1900–1901
 Health Committee 1900–1901
 Special (Ferries) Committee 1900–1901
 Building Act Committee 1901
 Special Sewerage Committee 1905
 Member of Board of Waterworks 1905

During his term as mayor, Brisbane was in 1901 visited by the Duke and Duchess of Cornwall and York (later King George V and Queen Mary). In recognition of his work for that occasion, he was appointed a Companion of the Order of St Michael and St George (CMG) 15 May 1901.

Thomas Proe was president for some years of the Licensed Victuallers' Association, a member of the Brisbane Metropolitan Water Board, and a member of the Amalgamated Society of Engineers.

He was also a member of the Masons.

See also
 List of mayors and lord mayors of Brisbane

Notes

External links
 Photo of Thomas Proe, as mayor in 1901

Mayors and Lord Mayors of Brisbane
Burials at Toowong Cemetery
1852 births
1922 deaths